WFTT-TV (channel 62) is a religious television station licensed to Venice, Florida, United States, serving the Tampa Bay area. Owned by Entravision Communications, the station maintains transmitter facilities in Riverview, Florida.

Despite Venice being WFTT-TV's city of license, the station maintains no physical presence there.

History

The station first signed on the air in 1988 as WBHS on channel 50 (a "-TV" suffix was added to the call letters in 1992), serving as the flagship station of the Home Shopping Network (HSN). The station was originally owned by HSN's broadcasting arm Silver King Broadcasting. HSN programming was supplemented with locally produced public affairs and human interest briefs for 4½ minutes each hour, which exceeded the number of hours independent stations were required to provide local programming (over 12 broadcast hours a week, counting repeats). The Sunday schedule was devoted to children's programming, including 1970s shows such as New Zoo Revue, to expose them to a younger audience.

In 1996, Barry Diller acquired the Home Shopping Network; two years later, HSN acquired USA Networks and renamed the broadcasting group as USA Broadcasting. Plans emerged in the late 1990s to convert WBHS-TV into a general entertainment independent station by 2002, mirroring the local programming-infused format that was already adopted by its stations in cities such as Atlanta, Dallas–Fort Worth and Miami; however, USA Broadcasting (owned by USA Networks) decided to sell its television stations in 2000, before any plans to change the station's format were made. The Walt Disney Company made a bid to acquire the group (which could have made a partnership with Scripps-owned WFTS-TV, which recently just became the new ABC affiliate for Tampa Bay over 5 years ago at the time), but was outbid by Spanish-language broadcaster Univision Communications. WBHS-TV remained with HSN until January 14, 2002, when it became a charter owned-and-operated station of Univision's secondary network TeleFutura (which was renamed UniMás in January 2013) and changed its call letters to WFTT.

On December 4, 2017, as part of a channel swap made by Entravision Communications, WFTT and sister station WVEA swapped channel numbers, with WFTT moving from digital channel 47 and virtual channel 50 to digital channel 25 and virtual channel 62.

On October 13, 2021, Univision announced it would take over operation of WVEA, as well as Orlando Univision affiliate WVEN-TV, effective January 1, 2022, coinciding with the end of licensing agreements on December 31, 2021, effectively ending WFTT's UniMás affiliation.

Technical information

Subchannels
The station's digital signal is multiplexed:

Analog-to-digital conversion
WFTT-TV shut down its analog signal, over UHF channel 50, on June 12, 2009, as part of the federally mandated transition from analog to digital television. The station's digital signal remained on its pre-transition UHF channel 47, using PSIP to display WFTT-TV's virtual channel as 50 on digital television receivers.

References

External links

Television channels and stations established in 1988
FTT-TV
Religious television stations in the United States
LATV affiliates
Comet (TV network) affiliates
Charge! (TV network) affiliates
Entravision Communications stations
1988 establishments in Florida
Venice, Florida